The men's  58 kg competition of the taekwondo events at the 2011 Pan American Games took place on the 15 of October at the CODE II Gymnasium. The defending Pan American Games champion is Yulis Gabriel Mercedes of the Dominican Republic, while the defending Pan American Championship, champion is Marcio Ferreira of Brazil.

Schedule
All times are Central Standard Time (UTC-6).

Results

Legend
PTG — Won by Points Gap
SUP — Won by Superiority
OT — Won on over time (Golden Point)
DSQ — Won because of disqualification

Main bracket

References

Taekwondo at the 2011 Pan American Games